The 1961–62 Copa del Generalísimo was the 60th staging of the Spanish Cup. The competition began on 12 November 1961 and ended on 8 July 1962 with the final.

First round

|}
Tiebreaker:

|}

Round of 32

|}
Tiebreaker:

|}

Round of 16

|}
Tiebreaker:

|}

Quarter-finals

|}
Tiebreaker:

|}

Semi-finals

|}

Final

|}

External links
 rsssf.com
 linguasport.com

Copa del Rey seasons
Copa del Rey
Copa